Rebel Soul is the sixth album by German hard rock band Bonfire. It is the first to feature a complete band membership since the reunion in 1996.  It was released in 1997 and then later in 1998 on the independent label Saraya Recordings.

Track listing

Band members
Claus Lessmann - lead & backing vocals
Hans Ziller - lead, rhythm & acoustic guitars, backing vocals
Chris Lausmann - rhythm guitar, keyboards, backing vocals
Uwe Köhler - bass, backing vocals
Jürgen Wiehler - drums, percussion, backing vocals

Bonfire (band) albums
1998 albums